Jörg Tauss (born 5 July 1953) is a German politician and former member of the Social Democratic Party of Germany (SPD). He was born in Stuttgart. From 2000 to 2009, Tauss was the spokesperson of the Education and Research workgroup of the SPD in the Bundestag. He also served within that time as regional party general secretary for Baden-Württemberg.

On 6 March 2009, his home and offices in Berlin and Karlsruhe were raided by the LKAs of both Berlin and Baden-Württemberg in a search for child pornography which he had allegedly obtained on his mobile phone. Although he claimed that the raid and investigation were politically motivated, he resigned from all government posts on 7 March, and was stripped of his parliamentary immunity on the same day. Prosecutors began the investigation after they had obtained access to phone numbers and addresses found on the mobile phone of a Bremerhaven man who was suspected of participation in a child pornography ring. He stated on 11 March that he had purchased the material only for investigation purposes pertinent to his office. He reports that his research suggests that child pornography is typically distributed by MMS and traditional mail, so that blocking websites is ineffective.

On 20 June 2009, Tauss announced he was leaving the SPD for the Pirate Party Germany in protest against that party's support of legislation that would block child pornography websites, which he said would set up a technical infrastructure of censorship without judicial review. On 1 July, Tauss appealed against the law because of formal reasons at the Federal Constitutional Court in Karlsruhe. On 8 September 2009, he was stripped of his parliamentary immunity and the next day he was formally charged. In May 2010 he got a suspended prison sentence of 15 months. The judge concluded that he had been active in the online child pornography scene for private reasons rather than out of political motives relating to his parliamentary work. However, the judge did not think his motivation had necessarily been sexual, it could have been sheer curiosity. 'This is a judgement which I cannot live with and do not want to live with,' Tauss said after the trial. He plans to appeal the verdict.

References

External links

 Tauss′ own press release on accusation of child pornography  (PDF, German)
 Tauss′ website
 Tauss′ old website
 
 Tauss′ profile on Flickr
 
 Tauss′ profile on Twitter
 Solidaritaet mit Jörg Tauss – A German website that defends Tauss

1953 births
Living people
Members of the Bundestag for Baden-Württemberg
Politicians from Stuttgart
Members of Chaos Computer Club
German politicians convicted of crimes
Members of the Bundestag 2005–2009
Members of the Bundestag 2002–2005
Members of the Bundestag 1998–2002
Members of the Bundestag 1994–1998
Members of the Bundestag for the Social Democratic Party of Germany